Kengkhar Gewog (Dzongkha: སྐྱེངས་མཁར་) is a gewog (village block) of Mongar District, Bhutan.

References 

Gewogs of Bhutan
Mongar District